The economy of Andorra is a developed and free market economy driven by finance, retail, and tourism.  The country's gross domestic product (GDP) was US$5.30 billion in 2022. Attractive for shoppers from France and Spain as a free port, Andorra also has developed active summer and winter tourist resorts. With some 270 hotels and 400 restaurants, as well as many shops, the tourist trade employs a growing portion of the domestic labour force. An estimated 13 million tourists visit annually.

There is a fairly active trade in consumer goods, including imported manufactured items, which, because they are duty-free, are less expensive in Andorra than in neighboring countries. Andorra's duty-free status also has had a significant effect on the controversy concerning its relationship with the European Union (EU). Its negotiations on duty-free status and relationship with the EU began in 1987, soon after Spain joined. An agreement that went into effect in July 1991 sets duty-free quotas and places limits on certain items – mainly milk products, tobacco products and alcoholic beverages. Andorra is permitted to maintain price differences from other EU countries, and visitors enjoy limited duty-free allowances.

The results of Andorra's elections thus far indicate that many support the government's reform initiatives and believe the country must, to some degree, integrate into the European Union in order to continue to enjoy its prosperity. Although arable land comprises less than 2% of the country, agriculture was the mainstay of the Andorran economy until the upsurge in tourism. Sheep raising has been the principal agricultural activity, but tobacco growing is lucrative. Most of Andorra's food is imported.

In addition to handicrafts, manufacturing includes cigars, cigarettes and furniture for domestic and export markets. A hydroelectric plant at Les Escaldes, with a capacity of 26.5 megawatts, provides 40% of Andorra's electricity; Spain provides the rest.

Overview
Tourism is the mainstay of Andorra's economy, accounting for roughly 80% of GDP. An estimated 9 million tourists visit annually, attracted by Andorra's duty-free status and by its summer and winter resorts. Andorra's comparative advantage has recently eroded as the economies of neighboring France and Spain have been opened up, providing broader availability of goods and lower tariffs. The banking sector, with its "tax haven" status, also contributes substantially to the economy. Agricultural production is limited by a scarcity of arable land, and most food has to be imported. The principal livestock activity is sheep raising. Manufacturing consists mainly of cigarettes, cigars and furniture. Andorra is a member of the EU Customs Union and is treated as an EU member for trade in manufactured goods (no tariffs).

Statistics

GDP: purchasing power parity - US$3.66 billion (2007)
country comparison to the world: 168

GDP - real growth rate: 2% (2007 est.)
country comparison to the world: 163

GDP - per capita: purchasing power parity - US$42,500 (2007)
country comparison to the world: 15

GDP - composition by sector: 
agriculture: N/A
industry: N/A
services: N/A

Population below poverty line: N/A

Household income or consumption by percentage share:
lowest 10%: N/A
highest 10%: N/A

Inflation rate (consumer prices):
3.9% (2007)
country comparison to the world: 59

Labor force: 42,230 (2007)
country comparison to the world: 185

Labor force - by occupation:
agriculture 0.3%, industry 20.8%, services 79% (2007)

Unemployment rate: 2.9%
country comparison to the world: 1

Budget:
revenues: US$496.9 million
expenditures: US$496.8 million (2007)

Industries:
tourism (particularly skiing), cattle raising, timber, banking, tobacco, furniture

Industrial production growth rate: N/A

Electricity - production: N/A

Electricity - production by source:
fossil fuel: 0%
hydro: 40%
nuclear: 0%
other: 60% imported from Spain

Electricity - consumption: N/A

Electricity - exports: N/A

Electricity - imports: N/A ; note - imports electricity from Spain and France; Andorra generates a small amount of hydropower

Agriculture - products: small quantities of rye, wheat, barley, oats, vegetables; sheep

Exports: US$117.1 million f.o.b. (2007)
country comparison to the world: 193

Exports - commodities: tobacco products, furniture

Exports - partners: France 17%, Spain 59.5% (2006)

Imports: US$1.789 billion (2007)
country comparison to the world: 154

Imports - commodities: consumer goods, food, electricity

Imports - partners: Spain 53.2%, France 21.1% (2006)

Debt - external: N/A

Economic aid - recipient: none

Currency: Euros have replaced the French franc and the Spanish peseta.

Exchange rates: euros per US dollar - 0.6827 (2008), 0.7306 (2007), 0.7964 (2006), 0.8041 (2005), 0.8054 (2004), 0.886 (2003), 1.0626 (2002), 1.1175 (2001), 0.9867 (January 2000), 0.9386 (1999)

Fiscal year:
calendar year

See also

 Tourism in Andorra

References

 

 
Andorra
bn:অ্যান্ডোরা#অর্থনীতি